The term  refers to the unification of ritual and politics. ritual in ritual-politics means "ritual" and religion. The word "politics" means "ritual" and politics.

、In Japan, the Oracle of miko can be traced back to the ancient theocracy, including the Yamato Kingship, where the Oracle of Wu had political authority, as well as the Ryukyu Kingdom, a system of government that was based on the Ryukyu Kingdom.

Shinto is an animistic religion, and one of its characteristics is the unity of ritual and government. Although not necessarily restricted to Shinto in Japanese, rites and ceremonies are used in English as Saisei itchi as a term for Shinto. Keiichi Yanagawa defined ritual government as different from theocracy, in which a professional clergyman directly governs. Ritual and political unity has been referred to primarily in the context of the ancient emperor system.

Ritual and Political Unity in Japan 
On March 13, 1868, the Meiji Restoration announced the Restoration of the Monarchy and the reestablishment of the Department of Divinities in a "Dajokanbudan".

Also used on January 3, 1870, in the "Declaration of the Great Teachings" (Dai-kyo Sengen).

Later in the Meiji era, the theory came to be replaced with Secular Shrine Theory, the idea that Shinto Shrines were secular in their nature rather than religious.

See also 

 Department of Divinities
 Theocracy
 Separation of church and state
 State Shinto
 Controversies surrounding Yasukuni Shrine
 Caesaropapism
 Bureau of Shinto Affairs

References

Bibliography 

 世界大百科事典&マイペディア 第2版[CD-ROM]，ISBN 978-4816981838
 広辞苑 第六版 DVD-ROM版，ISBN 978-4001301618
 安丸良夫・宮地正人編『日本近代思想大系5　宗教と国家』岩波書店，1988，ISBN 978-4002300054

  
  

  
  
  

Religion and politics
Political history
Pages with unreviewed translations
Japanese imperial history
Japanese Imperial Rituals